Alexander Robertson (14 February 1779  – 17 December 1856) was an English politician.

He was elected at the 1818 as one of the two Members of Parliament (MPs) for the rotten borough of Grampound in Cornwall,
and was re-elected in 1820.

The borough was disenfranchised in 1821 for gross corruption, but its two MPs retained their seats until the dissolution of Parliament in 1826.

References

External links 
 

1779 births
1856 deaths
Members of the Parliament of the United Kingdom for constituencies in Cornwall
UK MPs 1818–1820
UK MPs 1820–1826